The 2010 FIM Valvoline Croatian Speedway Grand Prix was the eighth race of the 2010 Speedway Grand Prix season. It took place on August 29 at the Stadium Milenium in Donji Kraljevec, Croatia.

It was scheduled to take place on August 28. However, the meeting was delay because the track was deemed unsuitable by the FIM Jury due to adverse weather conditions. The event will be re-staged on the next day at 12pm. It was second Grand Prix meeting which was re-staged at Sunday, after 1997 Speedway Grand Prix of Germany.

The first-ever Croatian Grand Prix was won by Greg Hancock from the United States, who beat British Chris Harris, World Champion Jason Crump and Fredrik Lindgren of Sweden in the Final. It was his eleventh Grand Prix winning. Hancock also won first-ever British (1995), Czech Republic (1997), Australian (2002) and Latvian (2006) Grands Prix. Croatian Grand Prix was 130th-ever Grand Prix meeting in history. Today winner, Greg Hancock is only rider who started in all 130 events. It was first final in the 2010 season without any Pole.

Riders 
The Speedway Grand Prix Commission nominated Jurica Pavlic as Wild Card, and Matija Duh and József Tabaka both as Track Reserves. Injured Emil Sayfutdinov will be replaced by second Qualified Substitutes rider Davey Watt. The Draw was made on August 27 at 13:00 CEST by the Deputy-Mayor of Međimurje County.
 (3)  Emil Sayfutdinov → (20)  Davey Watt

It was the SGP debut for Matija Duh of Slovenia. Duh replaced Holder in Heat 19 and finished 4th scoring 0 points.

Heat details

Heat after heat 
 Lindgren, Andersen, Gollob, Woffinden
 Holta, Hancock, Pedersen, Hampel
 Harris, Jonsson, Zetterstroem, Pavlic
 Crump, Holder, Watt, Bjerre
 Lindgren, Zetterstroem, Holder, Holta
 Crump, Harris, Andersen, Hampel
 Hancock, Pavlic, Watt, Gollob
 Bjerre, Woffinden, Jonsson, Pedersen
 Hampel, Lindgren, Pavlic, Bjerre
 Holta, Watt, Jonsson, Andersen
 Gollob, Crump, Zetterstroem, Pedersen
 Harris, Hancock, Holder, Woffinden
 Hancock, Crump, Lindgren, Jonsson (X)
 Holder, Pedersen, Pavlic, Andersen
 Harris, Gollob, Bjerre, Holta
 Hampel, Woffinden, Zetterstroem, Watt
 Harris, Watt, Pedersen, Lindgren
 Hancock, Bjerre, Zetterstroem, Andersen
 Gollob, Jonsson, Hampel, Duh (Holder - M)
 Crump, Woffinden, Pavlic, Holta
 Semi-Finals:
 Harris, Lindgren, Hampel, Holder
 Hancock, Crump, Gollob, Holta (F4)
 The Final:
 Hancock, Harris, Crump, Lindgren

The intermediate classification

See also 
 motorcycle speedway

References 

Croatia
2010